Jacob Cardwell Young III (March 22, 1968 – October 12, 2002) was an American football center who played college football for the University of Nebraska–Lincoln and attended Midland Lee High School in Midland, Texas. He was a first-team All-American in 1988 and a consensus first-team All-American in 1989. Young was inducted into the Nebraska Football Hall of Fame in 2000. He was killed in the 2002 Bali bombings.

References

1968 births
2002 deaths
Players of American football from El Paso, Texas
American football centers
Nebraska Cornhuskers football players
All-American college football players
People from Midland, Texas
American people murdered abroad
American terrorism victims
People murdered in Indonesia
Terrorism deaths in Indonesia
Deaths by improvised explosive device
2002 Bali bombings
Male murder victims